The 2008–09 Liga Alef season was the last season of Liga Alef as the fourth tier of the Israeli football league system. Third tier, Liga Artzit, was scrapped, while the Premier League and Liga Leumit were expanded to 16 clubs each, making Liga Alef the third tier, as well as expanding the two regional divisions to 16 clubs.

The season saw Ahva Arraba (champions of the North Division) and Maccabi Be'er Sheva (champions of the South Division) winning the title and promotion to Liga Leumit.

At the bottom, the bottom clubs in each division, Maccabi Ironi Shlomi/Nahariya, Beitar Ihud Mashhad (from North division), Ironi Ramla and Hapoel Masos/Segev Shalom (from South division) were all automatically relegated to Liga Bet, whilst the two clubs which were ranked in 12th place in each division, Maccabi Kafr Qara and Hapoel Nahlat Yehuda entered a promotion/relegation play-offs, and both remained in Liga Alef after winning the play-offs.

Changes from last season

Format changes
At the end of the season no relegation play-offs were held. The two bottom clubs were relegated automatically, while the third from bottom club was safe from relegation.

Team changes
 Hapoel Umm al-Fahm and Maccabi Ironi Bat Yam were promoted to Liga Artzit; Maccabi HaShikma Ramat Hen (to North division) and Hapoel Kfar Shalem (to South division) were relegated from Liga Artzit.
 Beitar Haifa, Hapoel Ahva Haifa and Hapoel Makr were relegated to Liga Bet from North division; Ahva Arraba, Maccabi Kafr Qara and Maccabi Tamra were promoted to the North division from Liga Bet.
 Hapoel Tzafririm Holon, Maccabi Ironi Amishav Petah Tikva and Ironi Ofakim were relegated to Liga Bet from South division; Hapoel Hadera, Hapoel Masos/Segev Shalom and Hapoel Arad were promoted to the South division from Liga Bet.

North Division

South Division

Relegation play-offs

North play-off
The 12th-placed team, Maccabi Kafr Qara, faced the Liga Bet promotion playoff winner Hapoel Daliyat al-Karmel.

Maccabi Kafr Qara remained in Liga Alef.

South play-off
The 12th-placed team, Hapoel Nahlat Yehuda, faced the Liga Bet promotion playoff winner Maccabi Amishav Petah Tikva.

Hapoel Nahlat Yehuda remained in Liga Alef; Maccabi Amishav Petah Tikva was promoted after Hapoel Umm al-Fahm (which relegated from Liga Artzit to Liga Alef) folded during the summer.

References
Notes

Sources
 The Israel Football Association 
 The Israel Football Association 
Promotion/relegation play-offs - Liga Alef livegames.co.il, The Internet Archive 

Liga Alef seasons
4
Israel